Rothkopf is a surname. Notable people with the surname include:

David Rothkopf (born 1955), American political scientist
Ernst Rothkopf (1925–2012), Austrian-born American educational psychologist
Louis Rothkopf (1903–1956), American businessman
Scott Rothkopf, American art curator